Ballara is the site of a deserted mining town in the locality of Kuridala in north-western Queensland, Australia, in the Selwyn Range between the towns of Mount Isa and Cloncurry. It is within the local government area of Shire of Cloncurry.

History
Ballara Post Office opened around 1914 (receiving offices had been open at Ballara and Hightville from  1909) and closed in 1927.

Heritage
Ballara includes the remains of a railway station for the long-closed narrow-gauge Wee MacGregor railway.

Environment
Ballara is commemorated in the scientific name of the Kalkadoon grasswren (Amytornis ballarae).

See also

Kuridala Township site
List of ghost towns
List of tramways in Queensland

References

Towns in Queensland
Ghost towns in Queensland
North West Queensland
Kuridala, Queensland